Marko Ristić (born 30 March 1997) is a Serbian football midfielder.

References

External links
 
 

1997 births
Living people
Sportspeople from Kruševac
Association football midfielders
Serbian footballers
FK Napredak Kruševac players
FK Trayal Kruševac players
FK Timok players
Serbian First League players
Serbian SuperLiga players